Phyllospadix juzepczukii is a plant species known only from shores of the Russian Far East (Sakhalin, Khabarovsk and Primorye). It grows in salt marshes along the intertidal zones of the Sea of Okhotsk.

References

juzepczukii
Salt marsh plants
Flora of Russia
Biota of the Pacific Ocean